The Audubon Place Historic District, in Tuscaloosa, Alabama, is a  historic district which was listed on the National Register of Historic Places in 1985.

It includes all 37 homes on Audubon Place, a curved cul-de-sac street entered off University Blvd. in Tuscaloosa, as well as five properties going further down University Blvd.  Specifically it includes numbers 1515 to 1707 on the odd-numbered side of University Blvd., and numbers 8 to 37 on Audubon Place.  Just 32 of the buildings are deemed contributing, however.  The entrance to the cul-de-sac is marked by "two massive concrete aggregate piers" and the street gradually climbs upward from there.  The street forks, with the right fork going to a circular end, and the left exiting out onto a one-way street.

The neighborhood was designed by landscape architect Samuel Parsons Jr. (1844-1923). It was a development by developer Mims P. Jemison (c.1860-c.1915), "a prominent Tuscaloosa businessman who envisioned the subdivision as a haven for young middle class families, many of whom later achieved higher economic, professional and social status."  The street was lined with oak trees planted by Mary Torrey Jemison.

See also
Caplewood Drive Historic District, a contemporary development, also NRHP-listed in Tuscaloosa

References

National Register of Historic Places in Tuscaloosa County, Alabama
Colonial Revival architecture in Alabama